Diakonia Catholic School is a school located at Pluit, Jakarta, Indonesia.  It was founded on March 11, 1994.  There are 332 students enrolled in the school.

Schools in Indonesia
Schools in Jakarta